Vincent Vidal (20 January 1811 in Carcassonne – 1887 in Paris) was a French painter, pastellist, and watercolourist. He entered the École des Beaux-Arts in 1837 and studied under Paul Delaroche. From 1843 to 1887, he exhibited regularly at the Salon, where he was awarded a third-class medal in 1844 and a second-class medal in 1849.  

Vidal was noted especially for his portraits of fashionable Parisian women. His famous sitters included Alexandre Dumas and Empress Eugenie. Vidal was awarded the Légion d'honneur in 1852.

References

1811 births
1887 deaths
People from Carcassonne
19th-century French painters
French male painters
19th-century French male artists